First published in 1981 by Elsevier, Principles of Neural Science is an influential neuroscience textbook edited by Columbia University professors Eric R. Kandel, James H. Schwartz, and Thomas M. Jessell. The original edition was 468 pages; now on the sixth edition, the book has grown to 1646 pages. The second edition was published in 1985, third in 1991, fourth in 2000. The fifth was published on October 26, 2012 and included Steven A. Siegelbaum and A.J. Hudspeth as editors. The sixth and latest edition was published on March 8, 2021.

Authors

Editors
 Kandel was one of the recipients of the 2000 Nobel Prize in Physiology or Medicine. He is currently a professor of biochemistry, molecular biophysics, physiology, cellular biophysics, and psychiatry at Columbia University. He is a senior investigator at the Howard Hughes Medical Institute and a recipient of the National Medal of Science.
 Schwartz was a professor of physiology, cellular biophysics, neurology, and psychiatry at Columbia University.
 Jessell became an editor of the book starting from the third edition.  He was a professor of biochemistry and molecular biophysics at Columbia University, and an investigator at the Howard Hughes Medical Institute.
 Hudspeth is a professor of sensory neuroscience at Rockefeller University. He is also an investigator at the Howard Hughes Medical Institute.
 Siegelbaum is Chair of the Department of Neuroscience at Columbia University and is also an investigator at the Howard Hughes Medical Institute.

Contributors
Including the editors—all of whom also contributed to individual chapters in the book—there are a total of 45 authors of this text. Included among them are several notable researchers and physicians. Several authors are also highly decorated scientists, including Nobel laureate Linda B. Buck and renowned neurophysiologist Roger M. Enoka.

Content
Principles of Neural Science is often assigned as a textbook for many undergraduate and graduate/medical neuroscience and neurobiology courses. The book attempts to at least introduce every aspect of our most modern understanding of the brain. The sixth edition is divided into sixty-four chapters, organized into nine parts:
 Part I: Overall Perspective
 Part II: Cell and Molecular Biology of Cells of the Nervous System
 Part III: Synaptic Transmission
 Part IV: Perception
 Part V: Movement
 Part VI: The Biology of Emotion, Motivation, and Homeostasis
 Part VII: Development and the Emergence of Behavior
 Part VII: Learning, Memory, Language and Cognition
 Part IX: Diseases of the Nervous System

References

Sources 
 Kandel ER, Schwartz JH, Jessell TM 1991. Principles of Neural Science, 3rd ed. Appleton & Lange.  
 Kandel ER, Schwartz JH, Jessell TM 2000. Principles of Neural Science, 4th ed. McGraw-Hill, New York.   
 Kandel ER, Schwartz JH, Jessell TM 2012, Siegelbaum SA, Hudspeth AJ. Principles of Neural Science, 5th ed. McGraw-Hill, New York. 
 Kandel ER, Koester JD, Mack SH 2021, Siegelbaum SA. Principles of Neural Science, 6th ed. McGraw-Hill, New York. ISBN 978-1-25-964224-1

Neuroscience books
Biology textbooks
Elsevier books
1981 non-fiction books